"You're Not Alone" is a song written by Tim Kellett and Robin Taylor-Firth and performed by British trip hop group Olive on their debut album, Extra Virgin (1996). First released as a single in August 1996, it found greater success in 1997 in a remixed version, reaching number one on the UK Singles Chart that May. The song has been covered by a number of artists, most notably by German trance DJ and producer ATB in 2002, Danish singer-songwriter Mads Langer in 2009, in 2017 by Scotty Boy and Lizzie Curious, and reworked by SaberZ and Zanny Duko in 2020 under the name, "Open Your Mind".

Critical reception
Barry Walters for The Advocate remarked that the song "in its original rendition resembles recent Everything But the Girl and now comes across as every other perfect pop-turned-disco masterpiece." Larry Flick from Billboard described it as a "lush, ambient tune that has the dark and torchy texture of Everything But The Girl, but with a far more mainstream-friendly, classic-soul flavor." He complimented singer Ruth-Ann Boyle that "brings a rich, smoky quality to the song, while musicians Robin Taylor-Firth and Tim Kellett underline her performance with sweet, swirling strings and jittery breakbeatstyled percussion." A reviewer from Daily Record called it a "hypnotic dance chart-topper", noting that features former Simply Red "keyboard wiz" Kellett. Caroline Sullivan from The Guardian remarked that "the single's summery lilt was balanced by a majestic keyboard riff".

Music Week rated the 1996 version four out of five, writing, "Weirded-out production and a good tune, this provides the perfect preview of an excellent album." In 1997, they rated the remix three out of five, describing it as a "sparkling pop groove [that] ought to do the chart business and already has strong club support thanks to remixes from the likes of Oakenfold and Roni Size." Ian Hyland from Sunday Mirror gave it eight out of ten, commenting, "No, not the greasy woman out of 'On The Buses' but a top dance groove techno type group who sound a bit European but have turned up this pearler of a club monster all the same. Remixes galore make it hard to ignore but if you are a Friday nighter, you'will have heard it already." David Sinclair from The Times noted that "strangely out-of-phase dance production gives this haunting tune a distinctive edge."

Music video
Three entirely different music videos were filmed for "You're Not Alone". The first video features all three band members Ruth-Ann Boyle, Tim Kellett and Robin Taylor-Firth appearing in spectral forms in a hotel room. The second video is the version which is seen the most and is set in a dark night-time setting in France. It features all three band members and includes scenes in a public toilet, and by a road with glowing headlights of cars. A third video (which also includes elements from the second) is a montage of the band members in dark, moody urban settings. This video only features the remaining two band members, Boyle and Kellett.

Awards

Track listings

Charts

Weekly charts

Year-end charts

Certifications

Release history

ATB version

German trance producer and disc jockey ATB covered the song and released it as a single on 15 April 2002 in Germany. The US CD release by Radikal Records had a cover misprint indicating the identical 4 track list as the 12-inch record release, however the CD contained 5 tracks.

Track listings

Personnel
 Songwriting – Tim Kellett, Robin Taylor-Firth
 Lyrics – Tim Kellett
 Production, arrangement, engineering – André Tanneberger
 Vocals – Roberta Carter Harrison

Source:

Charts

Mads Langer version

Danish singer-songwriter Mads Langer released a cover version of the song on 14 December 2009. The song charted in Belgium, Denmark, Italy, and the Netherlands. The cover version was later included on Langer's first international studio album, Behold which was released on 9 May 2011.

Track listings

Personnel
 Songwriting – Tim Kellett, Robin Taylor-Firth
 Production, mastering and acoustic guitar – Søren Mikkelsen
 Co-production, instruments and vocals – Mads Langer

Source:

Charts

Certifications

Other versions
 In 2009 the song was sampled by British rapper Tinchy Stryder on the song "You're Not Alone". It was released as a single from his second studio album, Catch 22 on 26 October 2009.
 In 2017, a version by Scotty Boy and Lizzie Curious went to number one on the US Dance Club Songs chart.
 A singer under the name Astræa (Jennifer Ann) released a version for the 2018 Lloyds TV advert.

See also
List of number-one dance singles of 2017 (U.S.)

References

External links
 

1996 songs
1996 singles
1997 singles
2002 singles
2009 singles
2017 singles
ATB songs
Bertelsmann Music Group singles
Breakbeat songs
Number-one singles in Scotland
Olive (band) songs
RCA Records singles
Songs written by Robin Taylor-Firth
Songs written by Tim Kellett
UK Singles Chart number-one singles